Flavius Constans (floruit 412–414) was a general of the Eastern Roman Empire.

Biography 

Constans was magister militum per Thracias in 412. In 414 he held the consulship (possibly while he still was magister militum); he took office in Constantinople.

His name is a clue of a potential relationship to Flavius Constantius, his Western colleague in the consulate and later Western Emperor with the name of Constantius III; however the sources do not mention any relationship between the two.

Bibliography 
 Jones, Arnold Hugh Martin, John Robert Martindale, John Morris, The Prosopography of the Later Roman Empire, "Constans 2", volume 2, Cambridge University Press, 1992, p. 311.

Imperial Roman consuls
Magistri militum
5th-century Romans
5th-century Roman consuls
Byzantine generals